Dolenje pri Jelšanah is a village north of Jelšane in the Municipality of Ilirska Bistrica in the Inner Carniola region of Slovenia, next to the border with Croatia. The settlement includes the hamlets of Dolnji Kraj, Gornji Kraj, and Vrh Žloštajna.

Geography
The built-up part of the settlement occupies a small level area, the Dolenje Karst Field, along the road from Ilirska Bistrica to Rijeka. Elevations in the settlement include Big Peak (597 m), Brščice Hill (538 m), Kalič Hill (601 m), Kičiber Hill (also: Čičiber, 578 m), Kilovec Hill (516 m), Staregutnik Hill (568 m), and Stražnica Hill (also: Stražica, 577 m). Dolenje pri Jelšanah lies in a heavily karstified area with many caves, sinkholes, and losing streams. One of these streams flows through the village and disappears into Šapjan Cave. Dolenje Creek has its source below Stražnica Hill and is known locally as Žloštajn Creek. The stream follows the road to Mala Bukovica, where it joins Molja Creek.

Name
The name of the settlement was changed from Dolenje to Dolenje pri Jelšanah in 1955. The name Dolenje pri Jelšanah literally means 'Dolenje near Jelšane'. The toponym Dolenje is derived from the adjective dolenji 'lower'. It is an originally masculine accusative plural form (ending in -e) that was later reanalyzed as a feminine nominative plural. The toponym Dolenje is common in Slovenia and indicates that the settlement lay at a lower elevation than nearby settlements.

Mass graves
Dolenje pri Jelšanah is the site of four known mass graves or unmarked graves from the end of the Second World War. They all contain the remains of German soldiers from the 97th Corps that fell at the beginning of May 1945. The Brajda Mass Grave is located in the overgrown Brajda meadow at the house at Dolenje pri Jelšanah no. 1. It contains the remains of six soldiers. The House No. 1 Grave is located in the yard of the same house. It contains the remains of one soldier. The House No. 8 Grave is located next to a fence under a spruce tree. It contains the remains of one soldier. The Farbečkina Mass Grave is located north of the settlement, in an overgrown meadow on the west side of the road. It contains the remains of two soldiers.

Church
The local church in the settlement is dedicated to Saint Anne and belongs to the Parish of Jelšane.

References

External links 
Dolenje pri Jelšanah on Geopedia

Populated places in the Municipality of Ilirska Bistrica